Abrotocrinus is an extinct genus of crinoids.

Fossil records
This genus is known in the fossil records of the Carboniferous period of United States and Canada (age range: 353.8 to 345.0 million years ago).

See also
 List of crinoid genera

References

Cladida
Prehistoric crinoid genera
Paleozoic life of Alberta
Paleozoic echinoderms of North America